Henrietta is a city in and the county seat of Clay County, Texas, United States. It is part of the Wichita Falls metropolitan statistical area. The population was 3,141 at the 2010 census, a decline of 123 from the 2000 tabulation of 3,264.

History

Henrietta is one of the oldest settled towns in north central Texas. It sits at the crossroads of U.S. Highway 287, U.S. Highway 82, State Highway 148, and Farm to Market Road 1197 in north central Clay County.

Clay and Montague counties were separated in 1857 from Cooke County to the east, and Henrietta was named as the county seat. The naming of the town remains a mystery, though several explanations have been offered. Regardless of the origin of its name, Henrietta became the center of gravity for the fledgling county. In 1860, as the only town in the county, it had 109 residents, 10 houses, and a general store. It sat at the far western edge of Anglo expansion in north-central Texas, but Native Americans remained a viable threat to current and future settlers. In 1862, Henrietta opened its post office. In the early 1860s, there were continuous attacks from local tribes. By late 1862, Henrietta was abandoned, and white settlers returned east to Cooke and Montague counties. Remaining structures were burned. Anglos continued to attempt resettlement, and in 1865 after the Civil War, a group attempting resettlement was massacred. A number of Quakers attempted to reoccupy the former townsite, but its members were either killed or fled. In 1870, fifty soldiers and Kiowa Indians fought a battle in the ruins of Henrietta.

After the battle, white settlers returned to Henrietta, this time permanently. In 1874, the post office reopened, and Henrietta quickly became the economic hub of north-central Texas. In 1882, the Fort Worth and Denver Railway reached Henrietta on its southern side, and in 1887, Henrietta became the westernmost terminus for the Gainesville, Henrietta, and Western Railway.

In 1895, the Wichita Falls Railway, one of the properties of Joseph A. Kemp and Frank Kell, linked Henrietta with Wichita Falls; sold in 1911, this  segment was operated thereafter by the Missouri-Kansas-Texas Railroad, known as the Katy. This particular track was abandoned in 1970. MK&T then built in Wichita Falls a station, offices, a roundhouse, and three switching tracks.

After heavy lobbying by businessmen, Henrietta became a logistical supply point for various operations in north-central Texas, including mining in Foard and Archer counties. The Southwestern Railway Company in 1910 completed a rail linking Henrietta with Archer City.

Though it had been settled earlier, Henrietta did not incorporate until 1881. The Clay County courthouse was built in 1884 and is still in use. By 1890, the population had reached 2,100, and the town boasted a 400-seat opera house, five churches, a new jailhouse, and a school. From 1893 to 1895, it had a college—Henrietta Normal College—for the training of teachers. It remained the economic hub of the county at the turn of the 20th century.

The St. Elmo Hotel, established about 1895 in Henrietta, had among its guests Quanah Parker, who married two of his wives there, and U.S. President Theodore Roosevelt, when he toured the North Texas area. When the top floors of the hotel burned, the facility closed and never reopened. A portion of the lower floor now houses an antiques store.

The growth of Henrietta waned in the 20th century as Wichita Falls grew rapidly into the most prosperous economic center in the area. The Southwestern Railway line was abandoned in 1920, and the Gainesville, Henrietta, and Western Railway line closed in 1969. By 1990, the population remained under 3,000. In 2000, it topped 3,000 for the first time since the 1970 census. In many ways, Henrietta is a "bedroom community" for Wichita Falls but is still the largest city in Clay County.

The play Texas presented during summers at the Palo Duro Canyon near Amarillo is loosely based on the history of Henrietta.

The 1995 film, The Stars Fell on Henrietta, produced by Clint Eastwood and David Valdez, and starring Robert Duvall, Brian Dennehy and Billy Bob Thornton, depicts the Texas oil rush of the 1930s and is set in Henrietta.

Geography

Henrietta is located near the center of Clay County at  (33.8160, –98.1938).

Demographics

2020 census

As of the 2020 United States census, there were 3,111 people, 1,287 households, and 817 families residing in the city.

2000 census
As of the census of 2000, there were 3,264 people, 1,308 households, and 893 families residing in the city. The population density was 694.8 people per square mile (268.1/km2). There were 1,460 housing units at an average density of 310.8 per square mile (119.9/km2). The racial makeup of the city was 95.89% White, 0.89% African American, 1.04% Native American, 0.98% from other races, and 1.19% from two or more races. Hispanic or Latino of any race were 2.94% of the population.

There were 1,308 households, out of which 33.3% had children under the age of 18 living with them, 55.4% were married couples living together, 9.8% had a female householder with no husband present, and 31.7% were non-families. 29.1% of all households were made up of individuals, and 17.5% had someone living alone who was 65 years of age or older. The average household size was 2.43 and the average family size was 3.01.

In the city, the population was spread out, with 26.3% under the age of 18, 6.8% from 18 to 24, 26.6% from 25 to 44, 21.1% from 45 to 64, and 19.2% who were 65 years of age or older. The median age was 39 years. For every 100 females, there were 87.5 males. For every 100 females age 18 and over, there were 82.1 males.

The median income for a household in the city was $32,835, and the median income for a family was $40,797. Males had a median income of $27,765 versus $21,335 for females. The per capita income for the city was $15,647. About 8.2% of families and 11.6% of the population were below the poverty line, including 15.5% of those under age 18 and 10.9% of those age 65 or over.

Education
The city is served by the Henrietta Independent School District. South of town between Henrietta and Jacksboro, students attend Midway Independent School District (Clay County, Texas).

Transportation
  U.S. Highway 287 West to Wichita Falls; East Southeast to Fort Worth
  U.S. Highway 82 West to Lubbock; East to Nocona
  State Highway 148 South to Jacksboro; North to Petrolia
  Farm to Market Road 1197 North to Hurnville
  Farm to Market Road 2847 Southwest to FM 2606, Lake Arrowhead, and Halsell

Climate
The climate in this area is characterized by hot, humid summers and generally mild to cool winters.  According to the Köppen Climate Classification system, Henrietta has a humid subtropical climate, abbreviated "Cfa" on climate maps.

Notable people

 Charlene Arthur (1929–1987), boogie woogie and blues musician
 Finis Alonzo Crutchfield Jr. (1916–1986), United Methodist Church bishop, born in Henrietta
 Eddie Joe Davis, TAMU Corps Commander, 1967, Vietnam veteran/paratrooper 173d Airborne Brigade, Director of TAMU Foundation for over 20 years, and interim President of TAMU for 2 years
 Frank N. Ikard, congressman from Texas's 13th congressional district from 1951 to 1961, born in Henrietta in 1914

See also

 Abilene Trail

References

External links

 City of Henrietta official website
 The Clay County Leader, local newspaper
 See historic photos of Henrietta from the Clay County Historical Society, hosted by the Portal to Texas History

Cities in Texas
Cities in Clay County, Texas
County seats in Texas
Wichita Falls metropolitan area
1857 establishments in Texas
Populated places established in 1857